Noor Bukhari (Punjabi, ; born July 3, 1977) is a Pakistani former actress, director, model and television host. She featured in several TV shows, films and commercials. During her film career, she appeared in 44 Urdu Films and 20 Punjabi Films.

Career
Noor began acting as a child in Pakistani films in the mid-1990s. She started out with films such as: Pyar karan toh nai darna (1992), Uroosa (1993) and Jannat (1993). Then she started her career as a lead heroine in films like Jan Jan Pakistan (1999), Mujhe Chand Chahye (2000) along with Shah Shahid, Reema Khan, Javed Sheikh, Barbara Ali, and Atiqa Odho.

Then Noor starred in Ghar Kab Ao Gay (2000) with  Ahsan Khan, Meera, Shaan Shahid, Jawed Sheikh and Babar Ali. Other films included Aag Ka Darya (2000), Tere Pyar Mein (2000), No Paisa No Problem (2000), Wadaa (2000), Sohni Kuri (2000), Badmash (2001), Moosa Khan (2001), Billi (2001), Sangram (2001), Janwar (2001), Toofan Mail (2001), Kaun Banega Crorpati (2001), Daku (2002), Wehshi Jutt (2002), Ghazi Ilmuddin Shaheed (2002), Dosa (2003), Ultimatum (2004), Zill-e-Shah (2008) along with Shaan Shahid and Saima Noor.

She left the film industry and made a come back with Bhai Log (2011), Revenge Of Worthless (2016), Saya e Khuda e Zuljalal (2016) and her last film is Ishq Positive (2016) with Wali Hamid Ali Khan, Saud and Faria Bukhari.

Personal life
Noor was born on 3 July 1977 in Lahore.

In October 2017, Bukhari stated that she would be retiring from entertainment indefinitely.

She is also a practicing Muslim who observes hijab.

Filmography

Television 

Telefilms

 Zainaby (2010)
 Oper Ghori Ka Makaan (2015)
 Salman Siddiquie Film (2016)

Drama Serials
 Uff yeh Larkiyan (2001)
 Mein Noor Ka Paristaar Hoon (2002)
 Mere Angnay Mein (2008)
 Phir Tanha (2011)
 Meri Wife ke Liye (2016)
Ye Junoon (2016)
 Kitni Girihan Baqi hai (2017)

TV Shows

 Pakistan Family Show (2007)
 Colours (2007)
 Un censoered with Noor (2019)
 Nachley (Season 1,2,3&5 )
 Morning With Hum (2010/2011)
 Noor Morning (2012-2013)
Hum Sab Umeed Se Hain (2013-2015)
Ramzan A-Plus Transmission (2014)
City 42 Eid Transmission (2014)
Tea@5 With Noor (2014)
Samaa k Mehman (2015)
 Good Morning Zindagi (2014-2015-2016)
10th Aniversrey of Hum Masala (2016)
 Jago Pakistan Jago (2016-2017)
Neo Channel Eid Transmission (2017)
Samaa Eid Transmission (2017)
Salam Zindagi as a Judje (2017)
Good Morning Pakistan along Nida Yasir (2017)
Samaa Eid Transmission (2018)

Awards

 Hum Telefilm Awards : Best Actress (Popular) for Zainaby (2010)
Leo Awards : Women Of The Year (2017)
 Sukh Chain Club Awards : Women of The Year (2017)
 Ippa Awards : Best Director ( Nominated ) for Ishq Positive (2017)
 9th Pakistani Achievement Awards : Legend Award (2017)

See also 
 List of Lollywood actors

References

External links

1977 births
Living people
Pakistani film actresses
Pakistani female models
Pakistani television actresses
Pakistani Muslims
Pakistani child actresses
20th-century Pakistani actresses
21st-century Pakistani actresses
Actresses in Pashto cinema
Actresses in Punjabi cinema
Actresses in Urdu cinema